WarioWare: Get It Together! is a party video game developed by Nintendo and Intelligent Systems and published by Nintendo for the Nintendo Switch. It is the tenth installment in the WarioWare series, following WarioWare Gold (2018) for the Nintendo 3DS, and was announced at E3 2021 during the Nintendo Direct presentation. A demo of the game was released on the Nintendo eShop on August 19, 2021. The game was released worldwide on September 10, 2021. It sold 1.27 million copies worldwide.

Gameplay
Get It Together! continues the WarioWare series tradition of tasking players with completing sets of "microgames", which each require the player to clear an objective in just a few seconds. In this game, Wario and his friends have been sucked inside his latest gaming device, meaning they must participate in the microgames themselves.

As such, the game has up to two players control a group of characters, randomly alternating between them in between Microgames. Characters are controlled using the directional stick and a single button, with each character behaving differently in how they move and what actions they can do. For example, Wario flies around on a jetpack and can perform a shoulder charge, Mona alternates between automatically riding her scooter and controlling a boomerang in the air, and 18-Volt fires CDs from a stationary position and can only move around by hooking onto rings. These unique abilities mean each character has different ways of clearing the same microgame. For example, a microgame that requires spinning a windmill around can be cleared by either pushing the windmill physically or hitting it with projectiles. Up to 20 different characters can be unlocked for selection.

There are party-style minigames for up to four players outside of story mode. There is also a ranked mode in the game called the Wario Cup featuring various different challenges.

The player can give presents (named prezzies in-game) to the various playable characters to level them up. Leveling up a character will result in the base score being raised in which can benefit the player in the Wario Cup. The player will also be able to customize the appearance of the playable character of choice. Prezzies can be obtained in the emporium and by other means.

Plot
The game begins with Wario and his friends at his company WarioWare Inc. (which includes Lulu, who previously appeared in WarioWare: Gold) when Wario finishes the game unit they have been developing. When he tries to start it; however, the console does not turn on, much to Wario and his friends' confusion. Annoyed, Wario throws the console in the air and he, along with his friends, get sucked inside the game, are turned into digitalized versions of themselves, and enter the world of games. When they wake up, they discover that their game has been invaded by "Game Bugs", which cause corruption and glitches within the game's levels. Wario and his friends have to defeat these bugs to clean the game and return to the real world.

Eventually, the group defeat the game's final bug, the Wario Bug, a corrupted and possessed version of Wario. They then leave the game bugs alone after Wario gives the bugs a home in the final level. "The Supreme Developer", a god-like figure with Wario's nose and mustache, appears to them after that and tells them that he brought Wario and his friends into the game to clear it of the game bugs, which Wario inadvertently caused due to his poor programming skills. He then tells the group that they are free to go. Back outside, everyone learns of Wario's involvement in creating the game bugs and angrily chase him down, but he notices that three of WarioWare's members are still stuck in the game, and the group goes back into the game to find them.

Upon re-entering the game world, the Supreme Developer tells the group that their friends have been captured, although it was done by a mysterious figure and not the Game Bugs. They then progress through a series of skyscrapers that their friends are trapped within, all three of which have treasure inside of them. At one point, they are joined by Penny, the only main character who is not a member of WarioWare Inc. When all three pieces of treasure have eventually been collected, the group finds a note that dares them to combine the treasure. They combine the treasures which turn into a watering can that they use to grow a giant beanstalk, but it disappears afterwards, to Wario's dismay. They climb the beanstalk and defeat the final boss, who turns out to be Pyoro, the main character of a fictional game franchise within Wario‘s world, who took up residence in Wario's game too because he wanted to have fun. After his defeat, Wario is disappointed that Pyoro has no more treasure.

Reception 

WarioWare: Get It Together! received "generally favorable reviews" according to Metacritic.

Game Informer liked the microgames calling them "creative", but felt the game's need to make each game playable by every character limited the gameplay variety. Praising the story mode, Nintendo Life found it helped introduce the player to each character and their abilities, writing that the use of characters "ups the ante in terms of the series' signature screwiness and the number of ways you've got to engage with it". Eurogamer liked the new micro-games, saying they switched from "line drawings one minute, anime the next, watercolours: it's a riot of imagination".

Overall enjoying the co-op the game offered, The Washington Post wrote that some characters had better movement and abilities, describing it as not "long before I started sticking to the same three to four characters whenever possible, as those with a wider range of movement and access to projectiles definitely had an edge". TouchArcade was mixed on the game, liking the microgames and finale, but feeling there weren't enough collectibles or new games to unlock "The biggest bummer, for me, is the general lack of interesting unlockable minigames and toys... the absence of such in Get It Together! feels like a bit of a downer".

GameSpot praised the art, especially the new character models, saying they were "brought to life here with new 3D models that maintain the look of the sprite-based artwork of their original incarnations while animating more fluidly". PCMag enjoyed the boss fights, feeling they were a good change of pace from the microgames, "Not only are these games hilarious, but they test your ability to quickly read a situation and intuit what to do". While praising the new co-op modes, VG247 disliked the limited single-player modes, writing "the length of the single-player options [is] a little lacking". Destructoid was positive on the idea of different characters, but wrote that many of them were very similar to one another, "I really wish more was done to differentiate a few characters, because the raw count is fairly high, but similar to “clones” in Warriors games, that number shrinks a bit in practice".

The game was nominated for Best Family Game at The Game Awards 2021.

As of March 31, 2022 WarioWare: Get It Together! had sold 1.27 million copies worldwide.

Notes

References

2021 video games
Nintendo Switch games
Nintendo Switch-only games
Multiplayer and single-player video games
Malware in fiction
Party video games
Video games about size change
Video games about video games
WarioWare
Intelligent Systems games
Nintendo Entertainment Planning & Development games
Video games developed in Japan
Video games produced by Kensuke Tanabe